Eucalyptus remota, commonly known as the Kangaroo Island ash, Kangaroo Island mallee ash, or Mount Taylor mallee, is a species of tree or mallee that is endemic to Kangaroo Island in South Australia. It has smooth bark, often with rough, fibrous bark on the trunk, lance-shaped adult leaves, flower buds in group of between nine and twenty one, white flowers and hemispherical or shortened spherical fruit.

Description
It has smooth, greyish or yellow bark, usually with rough, fibrous grey bark on the trunk, sometimes also the larger branches. Flowering occurs from November to December and the flowers are white.

Taxonomy and naming
Eucalyptus remota was first formally described in 1934 William Blakely in his book, A Key to the Eucalypts from specimens collected on Kangaroo Island by Walter Gill in 1907. The specific epithet (remota) is from the Latin word remotus, referring to the location of this species being distant from those of its nearest relatives.

Distribution and habitat
Kangaroo Island ash is found on the western end of Kangaroo Island off the coast of South Australia where it grows on gravelly sands and loams over laterite in low mallee shrubland. It is found from Mount Taylor to Flinders Chase National Park.

Use in horticulture
Although not widely cultivated, E. remota is suitable for windbreaks or low shade areas and will grow quickly in sandy, acid type soils.

See also
List of Eucalyptus species

References

remota
Myrtales of Australia
Flora of South Australia
Plants described in 1934